Samuel Head (born 14 June 1993 from Portsmouth, Hampshire) is an English professional darts player who plays in the British Darts Organisation events.

Career
Head in 2012 almost caused a sensation when he reached the last 16 of the Winmau World Masters his first televised tournament. In the same year he won the British Teenage Open und started to play quite successfully on the PDC Youth Tour. Due to his consistency he managed to qualify for the BDO World Championships 2014 but lost first round to Mike Day from New Zealand. In 2019, he reached the Semi Finals of the Estonian Masters, losing to John Scott of England.

World Championship results

BDO
 2014: Preliminary Round (lost to Mike Day 0–3)
 2015: Preliminary Round (lost to Peter Sajwani 0–3)

External links

References

1993 births
Living people
English darts players
British Darts Organisation players